Neil Sperry is a Texas gardening and horticulture expert known for his books, magazine, radio program, and annual gardening show. Sperry was born and raised in College Station, Texas where he graduated A&M Consolidated High School as Salutatorian and Student Body President. He attended Texas A&M University and earned horticulture degrees from Ohio State University.  He married his wife Lynn in 1967, and they now live in McKinney, Texas.

While in high school and at Texas A&M University he owned and operated a nursery. From 1970 to 1977, he worked as a Horticulture Specialist for the Texas Cooperative Extension.

Neil Sperry hosted a radio show on Dallas station KRLD 1080-AM for over thirty years. On his February 13, 2010 broadcast, Sperry informed his audience that KRLD was exercising a 180-day opt-out clause in their contract. His broadcasting there ended in summer 2010. He now hosts a show on WBAP.

Two of Sperry's books have become favorites of Texas gardeners. His Complete Guide to Texas Gardening (published 1982 with a second edition in 1991), has been popularly known as the "boot book," in reference to its cover art. It remained a primary reference for Texas gardeners until the publication of Neil Sperry's Lone Star Gardening in 2014. This 344-page book contains comprehensive plant listings and more than 800 photographs taken by Sperry, an avid photographer.

Publications
 Neil Sperry's Lone Star Gardening: Texas' Complete Planting Guide and Gardening Calendar (copyright 2014)
 Neil Sperry's Complete Guide to Texas Gardening, "the 4th best-selling gardening hardback in American history."
 1001 Most Asked Texas Gardening Questions
 Complete Guide to Texas Gardening: Landscapes, Lawns, Fruit, and Vegetables (ASIN B000MAMD7G)
 Gardening GreenBook Just For Texas (ASIN B000O7Y9ZG)
 Neil Sperry's Gardening GreenBook (ASIN B000O825ZQ)
 Neil Sperry's Texas Gardening (ASIN B0017GX06W)
 Gardens magazine (1987-May/June 2015)
 Neil Sperry's Gardens electronic magazine (July 2015- )

Radio
 Texas Gardening (1980–present), a paid-programming weekly talk-show on KRLD and 60 other radio stations.  On July 10, 2010, his talk show on KRLD moved to WBAP.  Neil Sperry broadcast 1,573 weekends during his tenure at KRLD.

Newspaper
 His weekly gardening column appears in 20 Texas newspapers.

Recognition
 American Garden Communicator of the Year (American Association of Nurserymen)
 American Garden Communicator of the Year (United States Land Grant Universities)
 Man of the Year in Texas Agriculture (The Texas Cooperative Extension of Texas A&M) 
 Member, Texas Radio Hall of Fame, inducted October 18, 2003.
 Volunteers of the Year, McKinney
 McKinney Citizen of the Year, 2003

 Collin County Living Legends, 2007

Charitable Work
 Avenues Counseling Center past board president
 Serenity High School advisory board
 Crape Myrtle Trails of McKinney, chair
 Denton State School Chair, Volunteer Services Council board

See also
 KRLD (AM)
 WBAP (AM)

References

External links
 Neil Sperry's website

American garden writers
American male non-fiction writers
Living people
People from College Station, Texas
Ohio State University College of Food, Agricultural, and Environmental Sciences alumni
American horticulturists
Radio personalities from Dallas
Year of birth missing (living people)